Reckless is the debut studio album by Australian rock and pop band The Sports, released in May 1978. The album peaked at number 43 on the Australian Kent Music Report.

Reception

John Magian from Woroni said "Reckless is one of the finest debut albums ever, to emerge from Australia; passionate, alive, and in its own way, unique." adding "Their music represents a perfect synthesis of archetypal 50s romance and the cutting edge neurotic edge of life in the 70s.Ian McFarlane though it "displayed plenty of charm".
Jim Worbois from AllMusic said; "On first listen, The Sports sound a bit like early Joe Jackson. To leave it at that would be unfair to The Sports, who show they feel equally comfortable doing rockabilly ("Rockabilly Billy") or Van Morrison-style ballads like "You Ain't Home Yet"."

2014 Remaster

In 2014 an expanded 2-CD version was released by Warner on the Festival Label.  The original album was remastered and extra tracks include live performances and demos, as well as all four tracks from their debut EP Fair Game.

Track listing

Personnel
The Sports
 Steve Cummings - vocals
 Ed Bates - guitar, backing vocals
 Andrew Pendlebury - guitar, backing vocals
 Jim Niven - piano, backing vocals 
 Robert Glover - bass
 Paul Hitchins - drums
with:
 Joe Camilleri (as "The Camel") - saxophone

Charts

References

The Sports albums
Mushroom Records albums
1978 debut albums
Albums produced by Joe Camilleri